Cigîrleni is a village in Ialoveni District, Moldova.

References

Villages of Ialoveni District
Populated places established in 1569
1569 establishments in Europe